Places known as A-Town include:

Australia
Adelaide, South Australia
Armadale, Western Australia
Ashtonfield, New South Wales

Austria
Anthering

Belgium
Antwerp
Assebroek
Avelgem

Canada
Annapolis Royal, Nova Scotia
Aurora, Ontario

Denmark
Albertslund

Germany
Aßling
Augsburg
Amberg
Andernach
Aschaffenburg
Annweiler am Trifels

Netherlands
Arnhem
Almelo
Assen

New Zealand
Auckland
Aranui

Norway
Asker

Sweden
Avesta (locality)

Uganda
Arua

Tanzania
Arusha

United Kingdom
Ashby de la Zouch

United States
Akron, Ohio
Alameda, California
Algonquin, Illinois
Allentown, Pennsylvania
Alpha, New Jersey
Alton, Illinois
Amarillo, Texas
Anacortes, Washington
Anchorage, Alaska
Angola, Indiana
Appleton, Wisconsin
Annandale, Virginia
Arlington, Virginia
Ashburn, Virginia
Atlanta, Georgia
Attleboro, Massachusetts
Augusta, Maine
Aurora, Colorado
Austin, Texas
Austintown, Ohio

United Arab Emirates
Al Ain
Abu Dhabi